Face to Face is the self-titled debut album of the Boston new wave band Face to Face, originally released in 1984 on LP (BFE 38857) and Cassette  by Epic Records.  It peaked at #126 on the Billboard pop album charts in the summer of 1984.

Reissue
Epic Records made this available on Compact Disc in Japan exclusively, though the single "10-9-8" can be found on various 1980s compilation CDs made in North America. In 2006, the independent label Wounded Bird Records (woundedbird.com) issued the album on CD for the first time ever in the United States.

Music videos
"10-9-8" and "Under the Gun" were released as singles. Both videos can be found on YouTube.

Track listing
All songs written by Angelo Petraglia, except where indicated.

Side 1

Side 2

Track 11:
 Originally released in 1984 as Epic 12" Single 49-4989
 Produced and mixed by Arthur Baker
Track 12:
 Originally released in 1984 as Epic 12" Single 49-5033
 Produced by Arthur Baker
 Mixed by Arthur Baker & Chris Lord-Alge
 Edited by DJ Tony Moran & DJ Albert Calbrera (aka the Latin Rascals)

1984 debut albums
Face to Face (new wave band) albums
Albums produced by Arthur Baker (musician)
Albums produced by Jimmy Iovine
Epic Records albums